Robert Hutton (died 23 August 1870) was an Irish Whig politician.

He married in 1821 Caroline Crompton, daughter of Peter Crompton. Their eldest son was Crompton Hutton (1822–1910), a barrister.

References

External links
 

UK MPs 1837–1841
Whig (British political party) MPs for Irish constituencies
1870 deaths